Brief Moment is a 1933 American pre-Code drama film directed by David Burton and starring Carole Lombard and Gene Raymond. It is based on the 1931 play of the same name by S. N. Behrman.

Plot
Rodney Deane (Gene Raymond) is a rich playboy who falls in love with nightclub singer Abby Fane (Carole Lombard). Abby wants him to get a job, so he begins working for his father. She later finds out that he is not taking the work seriously and stills spends his days at the racetrack, so she leaves him. Rodney then changes his name and gets a real job. They are reunited by Abby's boss.

Cast
 Gene Raymond as Rodney Deane
 Carole Lombard as Abby Fane
 Donald Cook as Franklin Deane
 Monroe Owsley as Harold Sigrift
 Arthur Hohl as Steve Walsh
 Irene Ware as Joan
 Teresa Maxwell-Conover as Mrs. William Deane (as Teresa Maxwell)
 Reginald Mason as Mr William Deane

Reception
Brief Moment received positive reviews. It has been described as 'Capraesque'. Mordaunt Hall of The New York Times wrote, "An audience cannot help but be lured into a favorable reaction."

References

External links
 
 
 
 

1933 films
1933 romantic drama films
American black-and-white films
American romantic drama films
Columbia Pictures films
American films based on plays
Films directed by David Burton
1930s English-language films
1930s American films